Concord Township is one of seventeen townships in Dubuque County, Iowa, United States.  As of the 2000 census, its population was 830.

Geography
According to the United States Census Bureau, Concord Township covers an area of 36.4 square miles (94.28 square kilometers).

Cities, towns, villages
 Holy Cross
 Rickardsville (partial)

Unincorporated towns
 Cottage Hill at 
(This list is based on USGS data and may include former settlements.)

Adjacent townships
 Buena Vista Township, Clayton County (north)
 Jefferson Township (east)
 Center Township (southeast)
 Iowa Township (south)
 New Wine Township (southwest)
 Liberty Township (west)
 Millville Township, Clayton County (northwest)

Cemeteries
The township contains these six cemeteries: Bankston Park (historical), Christian, Cottage Hill Christian, Cottage Hill Protestant, Floyd and Holy Cross Catholic.

Major highways
  U.S. Route 52
  Iowa Highway 3

School districts
 Western Dubuque Community School District

Political districts
 Iowa's 1st congressional district
 State House District 32
 State Senate District 16

References
 United States Census Bureau 2007 TIGER/Line Shapefiles
 United States Board on Geographic Names (GNIS)
 United States National Atlas

External links
 US-Counties.com
 City-Data.com

Townships in Dubuque County, Iowa
Townships in Iowa